Euthyone celenna is a moth of the subfamily Arctiinae first described by Schaus in 1892. It is found in the Brazilian states of São Paulo, Paraná and Rio de Janeiro.

References

Lithosiini